Gintautas Umaras (born 20 May 1963) is a retired track and road racing cyclist from Lithuania, who represented the USSR at the 1988 Summer Olympics in Seoul, South Korea. There he won the gold medal in the men's 4 km individual pursuit and in the men's team pursuit, alongside Viatcheslav Ekimov, Dmitry Nelyubin and Artūras Kasputis. During the Soviet time he trained at Dynamo sports society in Klaipėda.

For most of his career, he competed at amateur level. He was a professional road cyclist from 1989 to 1991. Umaras achieved several world records: in 1984 he broke the record in men's 5 km individual pursuit; in 1985, 1986, and 1987 – in men's 4 km individual pursuit; and in 1988 – in men's 4 km team pursuit.

Umaras was among the people who helped to establish the National Olympic Committee of Lithuania when Lithuania regained independence from the Soviet Union. He was appointed as one of its vice presidents. Gintautas and his brother Mindaugas run several sport equipment shops in Vilnius and Klaipėda.

Major results
1988
 Olympic Games
1st  Individual pursuit
1st  Team pursuit

References

1963 births
Living people
Lithuanian male cyclists
Soviet male cyclists
Lithuanian track cyclists
Cyclists at the 1988 Summer Olympics
Olympic gold medalists for the Soviet Union
Dynamo sports society athletes
Olympic cyclists of the Soviet Union
Sportspeople from Kaunas
Olympic medalists in cycling
Lithuanian Sportsperson of the Year winners
Medalists at the 1988 Summer Olympics
Honoured Masters of Sport of the USSR